Sunnidale Park is the largest urban municipal park in Barrie, Ontario. It is surrounded by Sunnidale Road, Cundles Rd W, Coulter St, and Highway 400. The park was previously a golf course.  The park is home to a large arboretum, the Dorian Parker Centre, and it also hosts a community garden.

References

Parks in Barrie